The Gathering is a Dutch rock band formed in Oss, North Brabant in 1989. The band's lineup currently consists of founding brothers René Rutten (guitars) and Hans Rutten (drums), Silje Wergeland (lead vocals), Hugo Prinsen Geerligs (bass) and Frank Boeijen (keyboards).

The band's earliest releases were categorized as atmospheric doom metal with influences from extreme metal acts like Celtic Frost and Hellhammer, undergoing numerous vocalist changes before breaking out in 1995 with Mandylion. It was the Gathering's first album to feature lead singer Anneke van Giersbergen and the band's first to chart in the Netherlands. With van Giersbergen, the band's sound shifted from gothic metal to one influenced by shoegaze, post-rock and trip hop, starting with their fifth studio album How to Measure a Planet? in 1998.

In 2007, van Giersbergen left the group to focus on her new band Agua de Annique. The band replaced her with Wergeland, of the band Octavia Sperati. The band went on hiatus from 2014 to 2018, and their most recent album, Beautiful Distortion, was released on 29 April 2022.

History

Early years (1989–1994)
Founded by brothers Hans and René Rutten and vocalist Bart Smits, The Gathering formed in the city of Oss in 1989. Soon after they were joined by Hugo Prinsen Geerligs, Jelmer Wiersma and Frank Boeijen to complete their first line-up. The Gathering's earliest recordings were categorized as atmospheric doom metal with influences from death metal acts like Celtic Frost and Hellhammer.

In 1990 they recorded a demo tape entitled An Imaginary Symphony which met some positive reactions from the underground metal scene due to their unusual use of keyboards in metal-oriented music. A second demo, "Moonlight Archer" was recorded in April 1991, was picked up by several music journalists. Both demos suffered from poor production; however they did help establish the band's name on the live circuit opening for bands such as Dead Head, Invocator, Samael, Morbid Angel and Death.

After signing with Foundation 2000, the group released their debut album Always... in 1992. On this album, Bart Smits was accompanied by Marike Groot on vocals, who also joined the Gathering on stage for most of the gigs. The album sold nearly 20,000 units over the next few years in Europe. In 1992 both Smits and Groot left the group due to musical differences; the other members wanted to change direction towards a lighter, more progressive sound. Smits went on to form his own project, Wish, to explore a darker, heavier sound.

In 1993 the group recruited two new vocalists, Niels Duffhues and female counterpart Martine van Loon. A second album, Almost a Dance, was recorded and released in 1993 by Foundation 2000. The album was met with much criticism aimed at Duffhues' punk-ish tone being decidedly out of step with the music, and the album was largely written off as a result. The group collectively acknowledged their disappointments with the album and started writing new material and looked for a new vocalist.

Century Media years (1995–2001)
In 1995, The Gathering released Mandylion, their third album and first to feature lead vocalist Anneke van Giersbergen, through Century Media; proving to be their breakthrough and selling over 130,000 copies in Europe. Two singles were released from Mandylion, "Adrenaline/Leaves" and "Strange Machines", the latter which reached number 37 on the Dutch singles charts and helped raise the group's popularity in Europe and the United States. Tours of Belgium and Germany, as well as appearances at the Dynamo Open Air and Pinkpop Festivals further established the bands presence in the European metal scene. 1997's Nighttime Birds was stylistically and musically a companion piece to Mandylion sold over 90,000 copies and saw the group tour throughout Europe.

In 1998 the group acknowledged their growing influences and their need to experiment with a double album, How to Measure a Planet?. Produced by Attie Bauw, the album is a radical departure from the group's established sound. Upon release, the album received excellent reviews from critics who appreciated the band's absorption of new styles such as shoegaze and trip hop into its sound. Positive reactions came from all over the world, including the United States, where they played 14 shows during the summer of 1999.

In 1999 the band formed their own record label, Psychonaut Records, with the view of releasing their own music and taking creative control over how their music is marketed and distributed. Always... was re-released in 1999, followed by Almost a Dance in 2000, both re-mastered and fitted with new artwork. However, the band were still under contract with Century Media, they released a live album Superheat (2000) which was recorded in several Dutch venues during 1999.

Another successful chapter in The Gathering's career followed with the release of if then else (2000). The album is filled with diverse, intense and emotional rock songs, more compact than its predecessor. Fifteen months of touring ensued, taking them to virtually every nook and cranny of Europe, with a little sidestep to Mexico, and ending with a small Dutch club tour in October 2001.

Independent years (2002–2008)

In 2002 the band members took a break and tended to their private lives. During this period, they ended their contract with Century Media. The Gathering had to run their newborn label Psychonaut Records and their 12½-year anniversary was coming up. To celebrate this with their fans, they released the mini-CD Black Light District on their own label.

In early 2003, Souvenirs was released. Sleepy Buildings, a semi-acoustic live album, followed in 2004. This album was the last one featuring Hugo Prinsen Geerligs as the bass player. He was later replaced by Marjolein Kooijman.

In 2005, The Gathering provided the music for a CD-ROM titled "Passengers in Time: The Musical History Tour". This CD accompanied a history study book written by Professor Wim Kratsborn and the band did not consider it to be an official release of theirs.

The band released a DVD in 2005, entitled A Sound Relief. This contained more gentle semi-acoustic songs. But this is not their first DVD. Century Media had released In Motion without band permission at 2001. Nevertheless In Motion  had an acceptable success. The next plan was to release in 2007 a second DVD (recognized for the band) A Noise Severe which features the more hard rock sound of The Gathering. This DVD was recorded in Santiago, Chile at 24 March 2007 at the Caupolicán Theatre.

In April 2006 they released their eighth studio album called Home. They had toured in March in North and South America and, after a brief pause to let van Giersbergen treat a laryngitis problem, they continued their touring schedule with European dates and music festivals throughout 2006.

The Gathering toured throughout the U.S. and Canada with Lacuna Coil in early 2007. On 5 June 2007, it was announced that Anneke was leaving The Gathering to spend more time with her family and her own band, Agua de Annique. The band scheduled a final tour stop on 4–5 August 2007 at the Ankkarock Festival, Finland. The Ankkarock Festival was announced as the final performance with Anneke as vocalist.

Silje Wergeland era (2007–present)

In February 2008, The Gathering released a boxed set entitled Sand and Mercury - The Complete Century Media Years. This boxed set was limited to 3000 copies worldwide, and contained 10 discs including a selection of studio, live and compilation albums. The set also contained the audio from the In Motion DVD as a new live album, also entitled In Motion.

In September 2008, The Gathering released a collection of all their old material from 1989 to 1993 on a double CD. The album contains the demos, the never released promo 1992, live tracks and the Celtic Frost cover of "Dethroned Emperor". The songs were from the period of the first line-up with singer Bart Smits. All songs were restored and mastered by Mike Wead (King Diamond / Mercyful Fate) and was released by small Dutch independent label Vic Records.

The Gathering's ninth studio album, The West Pole, was released in May 2009, shortly after being joined by a new singer, Silje Wergeland.

On 16 May 2011, the band released the single "Heroes for Ghosts" via their Bandcamp page, as well as announcing a South American tour. The song would be featured on the then-forthcoming album.

On 12 September 2012, the band released their tenth studio album, Disclosure.

The Gathering celebrated their 25th birthday as a band with two sold-out reunion concerts at Doornroosje in Nijmegen on 9 November 2014. It was the first time that four of their singers (Bart Smits, Marike Groot, Anneke van Giersbergen and Silje Wergeland) performed together, and the band's first performance with van Giersbergen since her departure in 2007.

On 8 December 2016, they surprise released a double-disc of outtakes, demos & unreleased songs from the recordings of Souvenirs and Home, called Blueprints.

In June and November 2018, they played several shows in the Netherlands and did a small tour in Greece.

On 29 April 2022, the band released their eleventh studio album, and first in nearly 10 years, Beautiful Distortion.

Etymology
Frank Boeijen on the origins of the name of the band:

"The name the Gathering has been made like eleven years ago when we started this band. We were all between 15 and 17. We were watching a lot of movies those days. One of the movies spoke about immortality and that you could kill the immortals with cutting their head off [it's the first Highlander Frank is speaking about]. In the first part of the movie, they speak a lot about the gathering. There will be a gathering once with all the immortals. We thought it was a nice name for a band, and that's how we created this name. And you can feel it's a cool name for five people who come together to make fine music." (sic)

Members

Current lineup
 René Rutten – guitars, flute, keyboards, percussion (1989–present)
 Hans Rutten – drums (1989–present)
 Hugo Prinsen Geerligs – bass, guitar, triangle, flute, add. keyboards and piano, percussion (1989–2004; guest 2014; 2018–present)
 Frank Boeijen – keyboards, synthesizer (1990–present)
 Silje Wergeland – lead vocals, keyboards (2008–present)
Former members
 Jelmer Wiersma – guitars (1989–1998; guest 2014)
 Bart Smits – lead vocals (1989–1993, guest 2013 and 2014)
 Marike Groot – backing & co-lead vocals (1992–1993; guest 2014)
 Niels Duffhues – lead vocals, guitars (1993–1994)
 Martine van Loon – backing & co-lead vocals (1993–1994)
 Anneke van Giersbergen – lead vocals, guitars (1994–2007; guest 2014)
 Marjolein Kooijman – bass, backing vocal (2004–2014)

Timeline

Discography 

 Always... (1992)
 Almost a Dance  (1993)
 Mandylion (1995)
 Nighttime Birds (1997)
 How to Measure a Planet? (1998)
 if_then_else (2000)
 Souvenirs (2003)
 Home (2006)
 The West Pole (2009)
 Disclosure (2012)
 Afterwords (2013) - also categorized as a remix album and EP 
 Beautiful Distortion (2022)

References

External links

 
 

Dutch doom metal musical groups
Dutch gothic metal musical groups
Dutch heavy metal musical groups
Dutch progressive metal musical groups
Century Media Records artists
Sanctuary Records artists
Season of Mist artists
The End Records artists
Musical quintets
Articles which contain graphical timelines
Musical groups established in 1989
Musical groups disestablished in 2014
Musical groups from North Brabant
Oss